The MS Polstjerna is Norway's best-preserved sealing ship. The Polstjerna is owned by the Tromsø University Museum, and since 2004 it been exhibited in a dry dock in a conservation building near Polaria in Tromsø.

History
The vessel was built at Moen's shipyard near Risør in the spring of 1949 and launched the same spring. The ship had 33 fishing seasons and harvested close to 100,000 seals from the West Ice and East Ice, before its final season in 1981. It was then purchased by the Arctic Society (Arktisk Forening) and later transferred to the University Museum.

Dimensions

Conservation
The building that houses the drydocked ship was designed by the Per Knudsen architectural firm, which won a architectural competition for the facility. The building also features temporary and permanent exhibits.

References

External links
MS Polstjerna homepage

Museums in Troms og Finnmark
Museum ships in Norway
Education and research in Tromsø
Buildings and structures in Tromsø
Museums established in 2004
Sealing ships
1949 ships
Merchant ships of Norway